Tobi 14 - Coptic Calendar - Tobi 16 

The fifteenth day of the Coptic month of Tobi, the fifth month of the Coptic year. On a common year, this day corresponds to January 10, of the Julian Calendar, and January 23, of the Gregorian Calendar. This day falls in the Coptic Season of Shemu, the season of the Harvest.

Commemorations

Saints 

 The departure of the Righteous Obadiah the Prophet

References 

Days of the Coptic calendar